Pickett is an English surname. It is a variant form of Pigott. Notable people with the surname include: 

Adarius Pickett (born 1996), American football player
Albert J. Pickett (1810–1858), American historian
Allison Deforest Pickett (1900–1991), Canadian entomologist
Allistair Pickett (born 1973), Australian rules footballer
Bill Pickett (1870-1932), American cowboy and rodeo performer
Bob Pickett (American football) (1932–2010), American football player
Bobby Pickett (1938–2007), American singer
Brad Pickett (born 1978), British mixed martial arts fighter
Byron Pickett (born 1977), Australian rules footballer
Carroll Pickett (born 1933), American Presbyterian minister
Carson Pickett (born 1993), American women's soccer player
Charles E. Pickett (1866–1930), American politician from Iowa
Cindy Pickett (born 1947), American actress
Cody Pickett (born 1980), Canadian footballer
Cornelius A. Pickett (1902–1990), American politician and Mayor of Houston, Texas (1941-43)
Dan Pickett, (born 1968), American  technology entrepreneur, private equity investor and philanthropist
Dan Pickett (musician) (1907–1967), American Piedmont blues and country blues singer, guitarist and songwriter
George Pickett (1825–1875), United States Army officer and Confederate general
Harry Pickett (1862–1907), English cricketer
Hugh Pickett (1913–2006), Canadian impresario
Jalen Pickett (born 1999), American basketball player
Janet Taylor Pickett (born 1948), American artist
Jay Pickett (1961–2021), American actor
Joe Pickett (born 1956), American politician from Texas
John Pickett (disambiguation), several people
Joseph Pickett (painter) (1848–1918), American painter
Justin Pickett, British actor
Kenny Pickett (born 1998), American football player
Keri Pickett (born 1959), American photographer and filmmaker
Lucy Weston Pickett (1904–1997), American chemist and zoologist
Owen B. Pickett (1930–2010), American former politician from Virginia
Michael Pickett (musician), (born 1950), Canadian blues singer
Phil Pickett (born 1948), English composer, musician and record producer
Philip Pickett (born 1950), English musician
Reg Pickett (1927-2012), English former professional footballer
Rex Pickett (born 1958), American writer
Ricky Pickett (born 1970), American baseball player
Ritchie Pickett (born 1955), New Zealand singer/songwriter
Ryan Pickett (born 1979), American football player
Shane Pickett (1957–2010), Australian artist
Ted Pickett (1909–2009), Australian sportsman
Tim Pickett (born 1981), American basketball player
Tina Pickett (born 1943), American politician from Pennsylvania
Tom Pickett (outlaw) (1858–1934), American cowboy and professional gambler
Tom Pickett (1906–1980), American politician from Texas
Tony Pickett (born 1953), former Australian rules footballer
Victoria Pickett (born 1996), Canadian soccer player
William Pickett (cricketer) (1805–1849), English cricketer
William Pickett (alderman) (died 1796), English goldsmith and local politician, Lord Mayor of London in 1789
William B. Pickett (born 1940), American historian
William Vose Pickett (fl. 1840), British architectural visionary; early designer of metal building frames 
Wilson Pickett (1941–2006), American rock and roll singer-songwriter

See also
Pickett (disambiguation)
Picket (disambiguation)

English-language surnames